Lin Dunn (born May 10, 1947) is an American women's basketball coach, currently general manager with the Indiana Fever. She is most known for being the first coach and general manager for the Seattle Storm. She has more than 500 wins to her name.

A native of Dresden, Tennessee, Dunn graduated from the University of Tennessee at Martin in 1969. She coached for decades in the college ranks, amassing a 447-257 record in 25 seasons as a college head coach. In her tenure at Austin Peay State University (1970–1976), the University of Mississippi (1977–1978), the University of Miami (1978–1987) and Purdue University (1987–1996), she made the NCAA Women's Division I Basketball Championship seven times, and the Final Four once, in 1994 with Purdue. She is in the Athletics Hall of Fame at both Austin Peay and Miami. Dunn also was president of the Women's Basketball Coaches Association in 1984-85.

Dunn was abruptly fired at Purdue after the 1995-96 season, but resurfaced in the pros with the American Basketball League's Portland Power in 1996. She was ABL's coach of the year in 1998, right before that league folded. Dunn then became the first coach and GM of the expansion Seattle Storm in the ABL's rival, the WNBA. Her folksy southern personality was a hit in Urbane, Seattle, with fans often wearing Dunn masks and quoting her rustic aphorisms. The team started with a dismal 6-26 season.

Dunn left the Storm just as it was starting to have success. New superstars Lauren Jackson and Sue Bird led the team to the 2002 playoffs, where they were swept by the Los Angeles Sparks. Dunn then resigned, leaving the path open for Anne Donovan to build a championship team just two seasons later.

Dunn is a former head coach of the Indiana Fever. Dunn won the WNBA championship with the Fever on October 21, 2012.

On May 6, 2014, Dunn announced her retirement from coaching at the end of the year.

On June 14, 2014, Dunn was inducted into the Women's Basketball Hall of Fame.

On May 24, 2016, she was introduced as an assistant coach for Matthew Mitchell at Kentucky. On May 26, 2017, UK Athletics announced that Coach Dunn had signed a one-year contract extension.

In 2018, her role at Kentucky changed to special assistant to the head coach.

On February 14, 2022, Dunn left her role at Kentucky to become Interim General Manager of the Indiana Fever. In explaining her decision, she stated, "I wouldn't come back to another franchise. This would be the only place that I would consider coming out of retirement for."

Dunn was named the permanent General Manager on January 20, 2023.

USA Basketball

In 1990, Dunn was the assistant coach for the USA National team at the World Championships in Kuala Lumpur, Malaysia. The team, behind the 22 point per game scoring of Teresa Edwards, won all eight contests, with only the win over Cuba decided by single digits. The USA team faced Yugoslavia in the gold medal game, and won 88–78.

In 1995, Dunn served as the head coach to the R. William Jones Cup Team. The competition was held in Taipei, Taiwan. The USA team won its first six games, but four of the six were won by single-digit margins. Their seventh game was against Russia, and they fell 100–84. The final game was against South Korea, and a victory would assure the gold medal, but the South Korean team won 80–76 to win the gold medal. The USA team won the bronze medal.

Head coaching record

College

Professional

|-
| align="left" |POR
| align="left" |1996–97
|18||9||9|||| align="center" |4th in West|| || || ||
| 
|-
| align="left" |POR
| align="left" |1997–98
|44||27||17|||| align="center" |1st in West||2 ||0 ||2 ||
| align="center" |Lost Western Conference Semi-Finals
|-
| align="left" |POR
| align="left" |1998
|13||9||4|||| align="center" |Season cancelled|| || || ||
| 
|-
| align="left" |SEA
| align="left" |2000
|32||6||26|||| align="center" |8th in West|| || || ||
|
|-
| align="left" |SEA
| align="left" |2001
|32||10||22|||| align="center" |8th in West|| || || ||
|
|-
| align="left" |SEA
| align="left" |2002
|32||17||15|||| align="center" |4th in West||2 ||0 ||2 ||
| align="center" |Lost Western Conference Semi-Finals

|-
| align="left" |IND
| align="left" |2008
|34||17||17|||| align="center" |4th in East||3 ||1 ||2 ||
| align="center" |Lost Eastern Conference Semi-Finals
|-
| align="left" |IND
| align="left" |2009
| 34|| 22|| 12|||| align="center" |1st in East||10 ||6 ||4 ||
| align="center" |Lost WNBA Finals
|-
| align="left" |IND
| align="left" |2010
| 34 || 21|| 13|||| align="center" |3rd in East||3 ||1 ||2 ||
| align="center" |Lost Eastern Conference Semi-Finals
|-
| align="left" |IND
| align="left" |2011
| 34 || 21|| 13|||| align="center" |1st in East||6 ||3 ||3 ||
| align="center" |Lost Eastern Conference Finals
|- ! style="background:#FDE910;"
| align="left" |IND
| align="left" |2012
| 34 || 22|| 12|||| align="center" |2nd in East||10 ||7 ||3 ||
| align="center" |Won WNBA Finals
|-
| align="left" |IND
| align="left" |2013
| 34 || 16|| 18|||| align="center" |4th in East||4 ||2 ||2 ||
| align="center" |Lost Eastern Conference Finals
|-
| align="left" |IND
| align="left" |2014
| 34 || 16|| 18|||| align="center" |2nd in East||5 ||3 ||2 ||
| align="center" |Lost Eastern Conference Finals
|-class="sortbottom"
| align="left" |Career
| ||409||213||196|||| ||45||23||22||

References

1947 births
Living people
People from Dresden, Tennessee
University of Tennessee at Martin alumni
American Basketball League (1996–1998) coaches
American women's basketball coaches
Basketball coaches from Tennessee
Indiana Fever coaches
Kentucky Wildcats women's basketball coaches
Miami Hurricanes women's basketball coaches
Ole Miss Rebels women's basketball coaches
Ole Miss Rebels women's volleyball coaches
Purdue Boilermakers women's basketball coaches
Seattle Storm coaches
Women's National Basketball Association championship-winning head coaches
Women's National Basketball Association general managers
Austin Peay Governors women's basketball coaches